The Bangladesh national cricket team toured New Zealand in November and December 1997 and played four first-class and four List A matches against teams representing the northern, central and southern regions of New Zealand. Bangladesh also played three List A matches. They lost two by large margins, one was unfinished, and a fourth was abandoned without play. Bangladesh were captained by Akram Khan. Bangladesh had just won the 1997 ICC Trophy and was a candidate for Test status, which was granted on 26 June 2000.

Bangladesh had been playing List A matches since 1986, but the four first-class matches on this tour were the first first-class matches played by any Bangladeshi team.

Team

Akram Khan (captain)
Al Sahariar
Aminul Islam
Athar Ali Khan
Habibul Bashar
Hasanuzzaman
Hasibul Hossain
Javed Omar
Jewel Hossain
Khaled Mashud
Mafizur Rahman
Manjural Islam
Mehrab Hossain
Saifullah Khan
Sanwar Hossain
Shafiuddin Ahmed

Several leading players were unavailable, including Mohammad Rafique and Khaled Mahmud.

The tour

All the Bangladesh players made their first-class debuts. In the Bangladesh second innings Kerry Walmsley took 5 for 23 and Mark Haslam took 5 for 25. The match, scheduled for four days, finished on the third afternoon.

Mark Jefferson had innings figures of 3 for 5 and 5 for 42. Jefferson's match figures of 8–47 were his best in first class cricket. No Bangladesh batsman reached 50. The match was over by the end of the second day.

In Bangladesh's first innings Al Sahariar hit Bangladesh's first first-class century, 102 off 184 balls.

Chris Gaffaney and Michael Parlane scored centuries for the Academy and put on 213 for the first wicket. David Sewell took 5 for 34 and 4 for 47.

Assessment
The convenor of New Zealand's selection panel, Ross Dykes, thought Bangladesh played at a level below first-class standard – more like Hawke Cup district association standard. Wisden's report said the batsmen "played suicidal one-day shots early in first-class innings", and noted that the bowlers took only 36 wickets in the four first-class matches at a collective average of 47.16.''

Aftermath
Seven of the team – Akram Khan, Al Sahariar, Aminul Islam, Habibul Bashar, Hasibul Hossain, Khaled Mashud and Mehrab Hossain – all played in Bangladesh's inaugural Test match three years later. Javed Omar, Manjural Islam and Sanwar Hossain also played Test cricket. For Athar Ali Khan, Jewel Hossain and Mafizur Rahman, in contrast, the matches on this tour comprised their entire first-class careers.

New Zealand had intended to invite Kenya to play in the 1998–99 Shell Conference, but after Bangladesh's lack of competitiveness they changed their minds and invited the stronger Pakistan A instead.

References

External links
"Bangladesh & Conference Cricket" by Devon Mace
Bangladesh in New Zealand 1997–98 at CricketArchive

1997 in Bangladeshi sport
1997 in New Zealand cricket
1997
International cricket competitions from 1997–98 to 2000
New Zealand cricket seasons from 1970–71 to 1999–2000